Sif El Menadi is a village in the commune of Reguiba, in Reguiba District, El Oued Province, Algeria.

References

Neighbouring towns and cities

Populated places in El Oued Province